Oxyptilus orichalcias is a moth of the family Pterophoridae. It is known from Malawi.

References

Endemic fauna of Malawi
Oxyptilini
Lepidoptera of Malawi
Moths of Sub-Saharan Africa
Moths described in 1916